The Brown Covered Bridge is a wooden covered bridge in Shrewsbury, Vermont. Located in the northwestern part of the town, it carries Upper Cold River Road over the Cold River. It was closed to vehicular traffic in 2011 due to damage from Hurricane Irene and reopened as a National Historic Site on July 5, 2016. Built in 1880 by noted Vermont bridgewright Nichols M. Powers, it was designated a National Historic Landmark in 2014, cited as one of the finest and least-altered examples of a Town lattice truss covered bridge in the United States.

Description and history 
The bridge is a single span lattice truss of a type patented by architect Ithiel Town in 1820. One of the abutments includes an extremely large boulder, a clear adaptation of the bridge to its location. The bridge is believed to be the only standing covered bridge in the United States with a slate roof, a once-common local variant feature of area covered bridges. It has vertical weatherboard siding, with a small opening at the eaves. The bridge has received only routine maintenance throughout its lifespan, most recently in 2002, when it was resided and its abutments treated. The Brown Bridge sustained minor damage from flooding caused by Tropical Storm Irene in 2011, and was closed. It was slated for rehabilitation after a 2008 inspection.

This bridge was not the first to stand on the site, with maps of the area showing a crossing here as early as the mid 19th century. It was built in 1880 at a cost of less than $1100, by Nichols M. Powers, a noted Vermont bridgewright who then lived in nearby Clarendon. It is the last bridge known to have been built by Powers, who died in 1897. Powers' most famous work, the Old Blenheim Bridge in Schoharie, New York, was destroyed by flooding caused by Irene in 2011.

The bridge was listed on the National Register of Historic Places in 1974. It is one of about 110 surviving Town lattice truss bridges built before 1955, and was identified as one of a few high-quality covered bridges in a nationwide survey conducted by the National Park Service in the 2000s. The bridge was designated a National Historic Landmark in 2014.

See also
List of Vermont covered bridges
List of bridges documented by the Historic American Engineering Record in Vermont
List of National Historic Landmarks in Vermont
National Register of Historic Places listings in Rutland County, Vermont

References

External links

Covered bridges on the National Register of Historic Places in Vermont
Covered bridges in Rutland County, Vermont
Buildings and structures in Shrewsbury, Vermont
Bridges completed in 1880
Wooden bridges in Vermont
Historic American Engineering Record in Vermont
National Historic Landmarks in Vermont
National Register of Historic Places in Rutland County, Vermont
Road bridges on the National Register of Historic Places in Vermont
Lattice truss bridges in the United States